Villeroy is a commune in the Somme department in Hauts-de-France in northern France.

Geography

Population

History
The village was known as "Villa Regia", in 1129. It was once owned by the Knights Templar who built a wall around the village. 
The seigneury was first noted as Bailleul-Vimeu, which was then passed to the seigneurs of Rambures.

Places of interest
 The church of Saint Sauveur, rebuilt in the 19th century.

See also
Communes of the Somme department

References

Communes of Somme (department)